Jacob ben Machir ibn Tibbon, of the Ibn Tibbon family, also known as Prophatius, was a Jewish astronomer; born, probably at Marseilles, about 1236; died at Montpellier about 1304. He was a grandson of Samuel ben Judah ibn Tibbon. His Provençal name was Don Profiat Tibbon; the Latin writers called him Profatius Judæus. Jacob occupies a considerable place in the history of astronomy in the Middle Ages. His works, translated into Latin, were quoted by Copernicus, Reinhold, and Clavius. He was also highly reputed as a physician, and, according to Jean Astruc ("Mémoires pour Servir à l'Histoire de la Faculté de Médecine de Montpellier," p. 168), Ibn Tibbon was regent of the faculty of medicine of Montpellier.

In the controversy between the Maimonists and the anti-Maimonists, Jacob defended science against the attacks of Abba Mari and his party; the energetic attitude of the community of Montpellier on that occasion was due to his influence.

Jacob became known by a series of Hebrew translations of Arabic scientific and philosophical works, and above all by two original works on astronomy. His translations are:
 the Elements of Euclid, divided into fifteen chapters;
 the treatise of Qusta ibn Luqa on the armillary sphere, in sixty-five chapters;
 Sefer ha-Mattanot, the Data of Euclid;
 a treatise of Autolycus on the sphere in movement;
 three treatises on the sphere of Menelaus of Alexandria;
 Ma'amar bi-Tekunah, or Sefer 'al Tekunah, in forty-four chapters;
 a treatise on the use of the astrolabe
 compendium of the Almagest of Ptolemy
 Iggeret ha-Ma'aseh be-Luaḥ ha-Niḳra Sofiḥah,
 preface to Abraham bar Ḥiyya's astronomical work;
 an extract from the Almagest on the arc of a circle; 
 "Ḳiẓẓur mi-Kol Meleket Higgayon," Averroes' compendium of the Organon (Riva di Trento, 1559);
 Averroes' paraphrase of books xi–xix of Aristotle's history of animals; 
 Mozene ha-'Iyyunim, from Ghazali, including also a large part deriving from the Encyclopedia of the Brethren of Purity (Rasā’il Ikhwān al-Ṣafā’).

The two original works of Jacob are:
a description of the astronomical instrument called the quadrant (Bibliothèque Nationale, Paris, MS. No. 1054), in sixteen chapters, the last of which shows how to construct this instrument. This was translated several times into Latin (once by Armengaud Blaise)
astronomical tables, beginning with 1 March 1300 (Munich MS. No. 343, 26). These tables were translated into Latin and enjoyed great repute.

See also
 Hachmei Provence
 Ibn Tibbon, a family list
 Jacob's staff

References

External links
 (PDF version)

1230s births
1300s deaths

Year of birth uncertain
Year of death uncertain
13th-century French Jews
Arabic–Hebrew translators
Medieval French astronomers
Medieval Jewish astronomers
Provençal Jews
Jewish astronomers
13th-century French mathematicians